The Fylmz Festival was an independent film festival in Nashville, Tennessee, offering distribution and a $100,000 prize for Best Feature Film. A $3,500 prize for Best Short Film was also awarded. The last festival was in 2007.

Notes

References
Just Do It" by Jennifer M. Wood, MovieMaker Magazine, July 2006
The Indies' Guide to the Internet" by Patrick Z. McGavin, Screen International, August 4, 2006
Web Contest Seeks Submissions" by Julie E. Washington, The Cleveland Plain Dealer, October 21, 2006
The Big Picture" by Bill Ditenhafer, Nashville Lifestyles, May 31, 2006
Nashville filmmaker launches new site" by Ron Wynn, The City Paper, April 19, 2006

Film festivals in Tennessee
Defunct film festivals in the United States
Culture of Nashville, Tennessee